The Sangtam people, also known as the Sangtam Naga, are a Tibeto-Burman major Naga ethnic group native to the Kiphire District in the Northeast Indian state of Nagaland.

Like many other ethnic groups in Northeast India, they practice jhum, or shifting cultivation. Unlike other Naga ethnic groups in Nagaland, many of the Sangtam have retained their traditional beliefs in spite of embracing Christianity at the same time. Sangtams celebrate twelve different festivals, in particular Mungmung, all of which are affiliated with their traditional culture and religion.

The Sangtam people are one of the major ethnic groups in Nagaland. Towards the Southern part of Nagaland, we have the Sangtam inhabited area under the Kiphire District. The Northern part of Sangtam includes the Longkhim-Chare sub-division of Tuensang District. They are united under the common banner called "United Sangtam."  There are 62 (sixty two) villages among the Sangtams, 24 villages under Longkhim-Chare sub-division and 38 villages under Kiphire District. There are seven government administrative towns under united Sangtam jurisdiction. During the recent years, another part of Sangtam land has been recognized namely Tsithrongse and Mürise Village under Chümoukedima District and Sangtamtilla Village under Dimapur District.

See also
 Chakhesang Naga
 Sangtam language

References

External links 
 Webindia profile
 Ethnologue profile
 Mongmong festival

Naga people
Tuensang district
People from Kiphire district